The Académie des Beaux-Arts (Academy of Fine Arts) is a French learned society based in Paris. It is one of the five academies of the Institut de France. The current president of the academy (2021) is Alain-Charles Perrot, a French architect.

Background
The academy was created in 1816 in Paris as a merger of the Académie de peinture et de sculpture (Academy of Painting and Sculpture, founded 1648), the Académie de musique (Academy of Music, founded in 1669) and the Académie d'architecture (Academy of Architecture, founded in 1671).

Awards
Currently, the Académie des Beaux-Arts provides several awards including five dedicated prizes:
Liliane Bettencourt Prize for Choral Singing 
Simone and Cino Del Duca Foundation Prize for Music 
Pierre Cardin Prize for Design 
François-Victor Noury Prize 
Fondation Pierre Gianadda Prize

Previously the Académie granted the Prix Rossini for excellence in libretto or music composition.

Presidents 

 1995: Serge Nigg
 1996: 
 1997: Jean Cardot
 1998: Christian Langlois
 1999: 
 2000: Marius Constant
 2001: Pierre Schoendoerffer
 2002: Pierre Carron
 2003:  
 2004: Roger Taillibert
 2005: Jean Prodromidès
 2006: 
 2007: Pierre Schoendoerffer (2nd term)
 2008: 
 2009: 
 2010: Roger Taillibert (2nd term)
 2011: Laurent Petitgirard
 2012: François-Bernard Michel (2nd term)
 2013: Lucien Clergue
 2014: 
 2015: 
 2016: 
 2017: Édith Canat de Chizy
 2018: Patrick de Carolis
 2019: Pierre Carron (2nd term)
 2020: 
 2021 Alain-Charles Perrot

Members
Constituted around the notion of multidisciplinarity, the Académie des Beaux-Arts brings together sixty-three members within nine artistic sections, sixteen foreign associate members and sixty-three corresponding members.

The members are grouped into nine sections:
 Section I: Painting
 Section II: Sculpture
 Section III: Architecture
 Section IV: Engraving
 Section V: Musical composition
 Section VI: Unattached (Free) members
 Section VII: Artistic creation in the cinema and audio-visual fields (since 1985)
 Section VIII: Photography (since 2005)
 Section IX: Choreography (since 2018)

Current members:

See also
 Beaux-Arts architecture
 École des Beaux-Arts
 Academic art
 French art salons and academies

References

External links

 
 Institut de France website

Academies of arts
•01
Arts in Paris
Arts organizations based in France
French art
Institut de France
Organizations based in Paris
Organizations established in 1816
Arts organizations established in the 19th century
1816 establishments in France